The 2012 PDC World Youth Championship was the second edition of the PDC World Youth Championship, a tournament organised by the Professional Darts Corporation for darts players aged between 14 and 23.

The knock-out stages from the last 64 to the semi-finals were played in Crawley on 4 November 2011 and weren't broadcast live on TV. The final took place on 17 May 2012, before the final of the 2012 Premier League Darts, which was shown live on Sky Sports. The two finalists became PDC Pro Tour card holders for 2012 and 2013, and also received invitations to the 2011 Grand Slam of Darts.

Arron Monk was the defending champion, but he lost to Matthew Dicken in the first round. Michael van Gerwen, who lost the 2010 final, and James Hubbard contested the final at The O2 Arena, London. Hubbard won in the final 6–3.

Prize money

Qualification
The tournament featured 64 players. The top 28 players in the PDC Youth Tour Order of Merit automatically qualified for the tournament, with the top eight players being seeded. They were joined by qualifiers from 26 Rileys Dart Zone tournaments throughout the United Kingdom, as well as 10 international qualifiers.

The participants were:

1-28

Rileys qualifiers
  Steven Addison
  Michael Airnes
  Leon Bailey
  Liam Deveries
  Matthew Dicken
  Rhys Dudley
  Nicholas Ellis
  Marc Evans
  Michael Finch
  Matt Gallett
  James Hajdar
  Lee Hodson
  Matt Howard

Rileys qualifiers
  Joe Hunt
  Ryan Hogarth
  James Hubbard
  Thomas Humphrey
  Aden Kirk
  Daniel King-Morris
  Richard North
  Kurt Parry 
  Jamie Reid
  Benjamin Songhurst
  James Thompson
  Brandon Walsh
  David Williams

International qualifiers
  Robbie King
  Guy Holland
  Ryan Maher
  Shaun Narain
  Teemu Harju
  Oskar Lukasiak
  Franz Schrammel
  Sergio Garcia
  Max Hopp
  John de Kruijf

Draw

References

PDC World Youth Championship
PDC World Youth Championship
PDC World Youth Championship
PDC World Youth Championship
2012
2012 in English sport
PDC World Youth Championship